Rick Ketting (born 15 January 1996) is a Dutch professional footballer who plays as a centre-back for Eerste Divisie club VVV-Venlo. Besides the Netherlands, he has played in Finland.

Club career
Ketting joined Sparta Rotterdam at the age of 10 from his childhood club VV Nieuwerkerk and progressed through the entire youth academy of the club.

On 1 February 2019, Ketting joined Finnish club IFK Mariehamn on a one-year contract. On 12 January 2020, Ketting signed for Inter Turku. On 2 February 2022, he returned to Inter Turku for the 2022 season.

Ketting returned to the Netherlands on 20 July 2022, signing a three-year contract with Eerste Divisie club VVV-Venlo.

International career
Ketting was called up for the Netherlands under-20s by coach Remy Reynierse for a friendly against Czech Republic on 14 November 2015. He scored a brace, securing a 2–2 draw at Městský fotbalový stadion Srbská. His two goals made him the top goalscorer for the under-20s for 2015.

Career statistics

References

External links
 Netherlands U20 stats at OnsOranje
 

1996 births
Living people
Dutch footballers
Netherlands youth international footballers
Dutch expatriate footballers
Sparta Rotterdam players
Go Ahead Eagles players
IFK Mariehamn players
FC Inter Turku players
VVV-Venlo players
Eredivisie players
Eerste Divisie players
Tweede Divisie players
Veikkausliiga players
Association football defenders
People from Capelle aan den IJssel
Dutch expatriate sportspeople in Finland
Expatriate footballers in Finland
Footballers from South Holland